Blace is a small village in Croatia. The village is located in a small bay in the southern side of Neretva Delta. The nearby cities include Ploče and Opuzen. The huge beach, a few kilometers north from the village, is well-known for kitesurfing due to its shallow water.

The population consists of about 200 people. There is no hotel in the village but a majority of houses offer private rooms for rental.

References

Populated places in Dubrovnik-Neretva County